Bostra is a genus of snout moths. It was described by Francis Walker in 1863 and is known from Ethiopia, Mozambique, India, and Turkey.

Species
  Bostra albilineata  (Warren, 1891)
  Bostra amphidissa  Meyrick, 1933
  Bostra anhydropa  Meyrick, 1933
  Bostra asbenicola  Rothschild, 1921
  Bostra callispilalis  Le Cerf, 1922 (from Kenya)
  Bostra carnicolor  Warren, 1914 (from South Africa)
  Bostra chlorostoma  Meyrick, 1934 (from Congo)
  Bostra coenochroa  Hampson, 1917 
  Bostra conflualis  Hampson, 1906 (from South Africa)
  Bostra conspicualis  Warren, 1911 (from South Africa)
  Bostra dentilinealis  Hampson, 1917 (from Malawi)
  Bostra dipectinialis  Hampson, 1906
  Bostra evillensis   Ghesquière, 1942
 Bostra excelsa   Rougeot, 1984 (from Ethiopia)
  Bostra ferrealis  Hampson, 1906  (from South Africa)
  Bostra flavicostalis  Warren, 1914 (from South Africa)
 Bostra claveriei Rougeot, 1977
 Bostra fascialis Warren, 1895
 Bostra fumosa de Joannis, 1927 (from Mozambique)
 Bostra fuscipennis  Hampson, 1910 (from Zambia)
 Bostra glaucalis  Hampson, 1906 (from Tanzania)
 Bostra igneusta Swinhoe, 1895
 Bostra illusella Walker, 1863
 Bostra indicator (Walker, 1864)
 Bostra lateritialis (Guenée, 1854)
  Bostra legalis  Meyrick, 1933 (from Congo)
  Bostra leucostigmalis  Hampson, 1906 (from Tanzania)
  Bostra lignealis  Hampson, 1917 (from Kenya)
  Bostra linogramma  Meyrick, 1933 (from Congo)
  Bostra maculilinea  Hampson, 1917 (from Malawi)
 Bostra mesoleucalis Hampson, 1912
 Bostra nanalis (Wileman, 1911)
  Bostra noctuina  (Butler, 1875) (from South Africa)
 Bostra obsoletalis (Mann, 1864)
  Bostra ochrigrammalis  Hampson, 1906 (from Nigeria)
  Bostra pallidicolor  Hampson, 1917 (from South Africa)
 Bostra pallidifrons Hampson, 1917
  Bostra perrubida  Hampson, 1910 (from Zambia)
  Bostra phoenicocraspis  Hampson, 1917 (from Cameroon)
  Bostra phoenicocraspis  Hampson, 1917 (from Cameroon)
  Bostra phoenicoxantha  Hampson, 1917 (from Malawi)
  Bostra pseudoexcelsa   , 1984 (from Ethiopia)
  Bostra puncticostalis   Hampson, 1898 (from South Africa)
 Bostra pulverealis (Hampson, 1916)
  Bostra purpurealis   Hampson, 1917
  Bostra pygmaea   Hampson, 1906 (from Kenya)
 Bostra pyrochroa (Hampson, 1916)
 Bostra pyrochroalis Hampson, 1916 (from Somalia)
  Bostra pyroxantha   Hampson, 1906 (from Zimbabwe)

References

 Afromoths

External links
 
 

Pyralini
Pyralidae genera